Andrea Vyacheslavovich Chukanov (born 18 December 1995) is an Italian-born Russian football player who plays for Shinnik Yaroslavl.

Club career
He made his debut in the Russian Football National League for FC Tyumen on 30 August 2015 in a game against FC Zenit-2 St. Petersburg.

Personal life
His father, Vyacheslav Chukanov, is the 1980 Olympic champion in equestrian show jumping.

He was born in Italy at the time when his father had been living and working there for six years. His mother is also Russian. As a result, he has an Italian birth certificate but not the passport; his family never applied for citizenship despite being eligible. When Chukanov was 6, his family moved back to Russia, namely St. Petersburg, where he started his youth career. While living in Cosenza, he developed an interest in football and started to support S.S. Lazio ‒ his father's favorite team. He has also cited Hernán Crespo as his childhood footballing idol.

References

External links
 Profile by Russian Football National League
 

1995 births
Sportspeople from Cosenza
Footballers from Calabria
Living people
Russian footballers
Russia youth international footballers
Italian footballers
Association football midfielders
Association football forwards
FC Lokomotiv Moscow players
FC Tyumen players
FC Orenburg players
FC Veles Moscow players
FC Rotor Volgograd players
FC Urozhay Krasnodar players
FC Shinnik Yaroslavl players
Russian Premier League players
Russian First League players